Scotts Corner is an unincorporated community in Sussex County, Delaware, United States.

References

Unincorporated communities in Sussex County, Delaware
Unincorporated communities in Delaware